The 1934 Fermanagh and Tyrone by-election was held on 27 June 1934.  The by-election was held due to the death of the incumbent Nationalist (NI) MP, Joseph Devlin.  It was won by the Nationalist (NI) candidate Joseph Francis Stewart.

References

1934 elections in the United Kingdom
20th century in County Fermanagh
20th century in County Tyrone
June 1934 events
By-elections to the Parliament of the United Kingdom in County Fermanagh constituencies
By-elections to the Parliament of the United Kingdom in County Tyrone constituencies
1934 elections in Northern Ireland